The 2019–20 World Skate Europe Cup will be the 40th season of the World Skate Europe Cup, the second one with the new name of the formerly known as CERS Cup, Europe's second club roller hockey competition organized by World Skate Europe.
Lleida Llista Blava are the defending champions.

Teams 
30 teams from seven national associations will participate in the competition. League positions of the previous season, after eventual playoffs, are shown in parentheses.

Bracket
The draw was held on 6 September 2019 at World Skate Europe headquarters in Lisbon, Portugal. Spanish side Lleida Llista Blava and Italian side Valdagno received byes to the round of 16 as winners and semifinalists of the 2018–19 World Skate Europe Cup, respectively.

See also
2019–20 Rink Hockey Euroleague
2019 Rink Hockey Continental Cup
2019–20 Rink Hockey European Female League

References

External links
 Official website
  Roller Hockey links worldwide
  Mundook-World Roller Hockey

World Skate Europe Cup
CERS Cup
CERS Cup
World Skate Europe Cup